The German Association for the Protection of Intellectual Property (or GRUR e. V.) is a German professional association "concerned with the protection of intellectual property rights". It was founded in 1891 and publishes:

 Gewerblicher Rechtsschutz und Urheberrecht (GRUR),
 Gewerblicher Rechtsschutz und Urheberrecht, Rechtsprechungs-Report (GRUR-RR),
 GRUR International

See also 
 Intellectual property organization

References

External links 
  
  

Intellectual property organizations
Professional associations based in Germany
Organizations established in 1891
German intellectual property law
1891 establishments in Germany